Flavian Zeija is a Ugandan lawyer, academic and judge, on the High Court of Uganda, who doubles as the country's Principal Judge, effective 25 December 2019. In Uganda, a Principal Judge is responsible for supervising the justices of the High Court, including the assignment of duties to members of the Court. The Principal Judge is also responsible for supervising the Magistrates Courts below the High Court. 

In his capacity as the Principal Judge, Justice Flavian Zeija is the third-highest ranking judicial officer in the country. The top five judicial officers are ranked as follows: 1. the Chief Justice of Uganda 2. the Deputy Chief Justice of Uganda 3. the Principal Judge 4. the Secretary to the Judiciary and 5. the Chief Registrar.

Background and education
He was born in Uganda on 18 February 1969. He attended local elementary and secondary schools. In 1993, he was admitted to Makerere University, the oldest and largest public university in Uganda. He graduated in 1996 with a Bachelor of Laws degree. The following year, he obtained a postgraduate Diploma in Legal Practice from the Law Development Centre in Kampala. 

In 1999, he returned to Makerere University and was admitted to the Master's program in Law. He graduated with a Master of Laws degree in 2002. His degree of Doctor of Philosophy in Law, was awarded by the University of Dar es Salaam in 2013. He also holds a Master of Business Administration degree, obtained from the Uganda Martyrs University, in 2018. In addition, he is a member of the Institute of Chartered Secretaries and Administrators of the United Kingdom, since 2012.

Work experience
He has a wide experience as a practicing attorney. He started out in 1998, as a legal assistant with Kwesigabo, Bamwine, Walubiri & Company Advocates, a Kampala-based law firm. In the past, he worked at Tropical Africa Bank as manager legal and recovery, between 2002 and 2003. He also worked at FINCA Uganda Limited as legal counsel. At the time he was appointed to the High Court of Uganda, he served as the managing partner at Zeija, Mukasa & Company Advocates, another Kampala-based law firm.

In addition to practicing law, Flavian Zeija taught law at 1. Uganda Christian University 2. Makerere University and 3. Makerere University Business School (MUBS). At MUBS he served as the founding head of the department of Business Law.

Judicial career
He was appointed as a judge of the High Court of Uganda in 2016. He was assigned as the Resident Judge of Mbarara High Court Circuit, the largest circuit in the country. While serving in that capacity, in December 2019, he was appointed to his current assignment.

Notable judgments
The Principal Judge, may at his/her discretion, continue to hear cases, in his/her capacity as a justice of the High Court of Uganda. A notable case that he handled in September 2020 was Kalemera H. Kimera vs Kabaka Muwenda Mutebi II. In his dismissal of the suit, the judge pointed out that according to current Ugandan inheritance laws, a grandchild who is not expressly named in the will cannot contest the inheritance of a grandparent's estate. Those who can contest are (a) the legitimate children of the deceased (b) the illegitimate children and (c) any adopted children of the deceased. The judge ordered the complainant to pay the respondents' legal fees.

Family
Justice Flavian Zeija is the father of five children.

See also
 Alfonse Owiny-Dollo
 Richard Buteera
 Sarah Langa Siu

References

External links
 Website of the Judiciary of Uganda

1969 births
Living people
Justices of the High Court of Uganda
Law Development Centre alumni
Academic staff of Makerere University
Makerere University alumni
People from Western Region, Uganda
Academic staff of Uganda Christian University
Uganda Martyrs University alumni
20th-century Ugandan lawyers
21st-century Ugandan judges
University of Dar es Salaam alumni